László Komár (28 November 1944 – 17 October 2012) was a Hungarian rock and roll singer. His most popular songs include "No Miss", "Mondd kis kócos", "Táncoló fekete lakkcipők" and "Mambo Italiano". During his career, he released 18 studio albums. He has sold an overall 3 million records.

In 1966, he took part in the first edition of Táncdalfesztivál.

Heavily influenced by Elvis Presley, Komár was widely described as "the Hungarian Elvis". In 2011, he was presented with a lifetime achievement award by Hungaroton. He died on 17 October 2012 at the age of 67.

References

External links
 

1944 births
2012 deaths
20th-century Hungarian male singers
People from Veszprém County